West Air Sweden, operating as West Atlantic, is a cargo airline based in Malmö, Sweden.  It operates scheduled and ad hoc freight charter services for FedEx, DHL and UPS.  It is also contracted to operate mail flights for different postal services within Europe. Its main bases are Charles de Gaulle Airport and Oslo Airport, Gardermoen.

History 
Since 2011 the airline has been part of the West Atlantic Group along with British cargo airline West Atlantic UK.

Fleet

Current fleet
As of February 2023, the West Air Sweden fleet consists of the following aircraft:

Former fleet
West Air Sweden has previously operated the following aircraft:

 Hawker Siddeley HS 748
 ATR 72
 BAe ATP

Accidents and Incidents 
On 8 January 2016, West Air Sweden Flight 294, a Bombardier CRJ200 was operating a cargo flight from Oslo Airport, Gardermoen to Tromsø Airport, when it lost radar contact shortly after declaring an emergency at 23:31Z. The aircraft was later located having impacted the side of a mountain northwest of Lake Akkajaure about 10 km from the border of Norway in mountainous area without road access. The flight was carrying 4.5 tons of mail and parcels. Both pilots were killed in the accident.

References

External links

Airlines of Sweden
Airlines established in 1955
European Regions Airline Association
Cargo airlines
Swedish companies established in 1955
Companies based in Gothenburg